Virginia's 2007 state elections were held on November 6, 2007. Voters elected all 100 members of the Virginia House of Delegates to two-year terms ending in 2009, and all 40 members of the Virginia Senate to four-year terms ending in 2011. There were also elections for local offices (such as Board of Supervisors and Clerk of the Circuit Court) in most counties. Occurring simultaneously were local elections in some counties.

In general, the Democrats emphasized transportation and the grid lock within the Republican-controlled Virginia General Assembly. The Democrats ran a statewide coordinated "21/51" campaign seeking to regain control of both the House and the Senate. The Republicans emphasized the need to take local actions against illegal immigration.

State Senate
Previous to the election, Virginia's Senate consisted of 23 Republicans and 17 Democrats. Democrats defeated three incumbent Senators and won an open Republican seat to take control of the Senate by a 21 to 19 majority.

Election results
Party abbreviations: D - Democratic, R - Republican, I - Independent, IG - Independent Green, L - Libertarian

Note: Only Senate districts that were contested by more than one candidate are included here.

House of Delegates

Previous to the election, Republicans controlled the House of Delegates with 57 seats, compared to the Democrats' 40 seats, and three seats held by Independents. Democrats won four seats from the Republicans, defeating one incumbent and taking three open seats, while one Republican defeated an incumbent Independent, making the post-election composition of the House 54 Republicans, 44 Democrats, and 2 Independents.

External links
 Virginia State Board of Elections -- Election Results

 
Virginia